Ojaq Kandi may refer to:
 Ojaq Kandi, Hashtrud
 Ojaq Kandi, Khoda Afarin
 Ojaq Kandi, Minjavan, Khoda Afarin County